The Best of Sam Cooke is the second greatest hits album by American singer-songwriter Sam Cooke. Produced by Hugo & Luigi, the album was released in 1962 in the United States by RCA Victor. The compilation contains most of Sam Cooke's most well-known hits from 1957 to 1962.

Critical reception 
AllMusic critic Ron Wynn gave The Best of Sam Cooke three-and-a-half out of five stars and called it "an above-average greatest hits collection, although no sampler could fully convey Sam Cooke's genius." In Blender, Robert Christgau was more critical, giving it one star and recommending listeners overlook the album in favor of the 30-song compilation Portrait of a Legend: 1951–1964.

Track listing

Side one
"You Send Me" – 2:45
"Only Sixteen" – 2:02
"Everybody Loves to Cha Cha Cha" – 2:42
"(I Love You) For Sentimental Reasons" – 2:38
"Wonderful World" – 2:06
"Summertime" – 2:21

Side two
"Chain Gang" – 2:35
"Cupid" – 2:37
"Twistin' the Night Away" – 2:43
"Sad Mood" – 2:38
"Having a Party" – 2:36
"Bring It On Home to Me" – 2:44

Personnel
Sam Cooke – vocals
Lou Rawls – back-up vocals

Vinyl Re-Issue
In 2018, Sony Music reissued the album in its original vinyl format as part of the RCA Legacy Recordings series.

Notes 

Sam Cooke compilation albums
Albums produced by Hugo & Luigi
1962 greatest hits albums
RCA Records compilation albums
RCA Victor compilation albums